This article identifies the historical reform patterns of the South African prison system, focusing on specific actors, social movements, and underlying socio-political factors that precipitated reform before the apartheid struggle and after 1994, transitioning into the current reform challenges facing the South African prison system.

Prison system, pre-apartheid 
Lasting colonial influence is ingrained in the South African prison system. The early stages of organized punishment in the country were brought forth by the arrival of European settlers, but imprisonment as punishment did not occur in Africa until the late 1800s. Prisons functioned to suppress and exploit populations that potentially might have posed a threat. The organization of a cohesive ordered prison system in South Africa took place earlier than other African countries, around the early 19th century. This was largely a result of an established economic interest resulting from the Atlantic Slave Trade and a concentration of African human capital afforded by organized imprisonment. In the early stages of prison development in South Africa, a culture of racial superiority was pervasive. While white prisoners received acceptable living conditions, fair treatment and vocational training in preparation for their release, black prisoners were perceived as “subhuman” and faced subjugation and scrutinisation for their supposed racial inadequacy.

The persistence of colonial influence and this cultural subjugation of racial inferiority through the South African prison system continued into the twentieth century. Until the 1940s, less reform and a greater emphasis on the organization and infrastructural development of South African prisons took place. This occurred amid growing interest in the ideological understanding of modernism and an increased international focus on the developmental potential of Africa. In a period of “rapid industrialization,” the 1940s in South African was characterized by considerable urban migration, industrialization and technological development in an age of global war precipitated new transformations of ideological thought as well as new alignments and perceptions of social construction. In Germany, Jewish people and ethnic “others” were subdivided from the population and shipped to concentration camps across Eastern Europe. At the same time, racially-based conceptions of superiority also became widespread amongst colonial leaders in the African continent.

In South Africa, enduring colonialist concerns arose to comprise what was regarded as the “Native Question,” which addressed how to manage Black Africans stereotyped by an image of “the wandering native”. The “wandering native” became a caricature in justifying the South African threat of Black criminality. The perception was that an unemployed, unhoused Black African posed a serious threat to South African civil society, and liberal lawmakers devised a solution as to how best to punish him.. Rooted in Christian missionary doctrine and supported by the ideological savior-complex commonly known as the “White Man’s Burden,” prison systemization and reform would take shape in South Africa. Punishment as “an institution” became an outlet for white lawmakers to entrench a form of “social jurisdiction” as a presiding ideal for the modernization of society.

Prison consolidation, post-World War II 
To categorize the South African prison system following World War II, Natacha Filippi in “Deviance, Punishment, and Logics of Subjectification during Apartheid,” explains that  By 1948, the fabric of South African society remained systematically anchored by a discourse of racial discrimination. With South African prisons as the main institution to carry out punishment legitimized by racial superiority. Courts followed suit with “discriminatory verdicts and sentences”. In the 1950s, a series of discriminatory laws were passed to enforce the systemization of apartheid. The indecencies that followed represent our current understanding of apartheid today. Apartheid was a regulated system of segregation legitimized by law. These laws emphasized the perceived dangerous nature of an urban black population. Following Christian ideological codes on decency, white lawmakers restricted the freedoms of non-white populations. Targeted penal laws on alcoholism, drug dealing, and alleged impulses for violence led to a rise in arrests and incarcerations for Black South Africans.

As Black citizens were imprisoned in a subjective and racially-charged manner, the tense divisiveness of South African civil society became an epicenter for conflict and violence. During this period, Nelson Mandela began his twenty-seven year prison sentence for unfounded allegations that he had conspired to overthrow the state. The country's external racial conflict intensified in the 1970s following the Township Insurrections, which led to the arrest of thousands under the Terrorism Act, 1967.

South African prisons during the apartheid era 
The apartheid prison system was primarily characterized by a “plethora of restraining laws,” which increased the prison population, and sentencing of Black South Africans. In South Africa, cultural norms afforded the subjectivity of guilt to the assessment of whites. Black South Africans were adversely affected by this subjective enforcement of the law, and often spent extended years in prison for crimes they had not committed, but which white South Africans had condemned them for.

Within the prison, individuals were segregated based on race, gender, and conduct. It was along these lines that white and non-white prisoners were separated, and their meals, prison tasks, treatment, and punishment were contingent on their outward appearances. Underlying these lines was the sub-categorization of political, insane, and common-law prisoners. All non-white prisoners were considered unredeemable and requiring harsh punishment, while white prisoners were mostly perceived as being capable of institutional self-reform. During apartheid, prisons remained overcrowded and were disproportionately flooded with nonwhite prisoners. In Pollsmoor Prison in the Western Cape, an additional four new prison sectors were constructed to satisfy the overcrowding of inmates during the apartheid period. Political prisoners such as Nelson Mandela were kept separate and completely isolated from the outside world.

List of post-apartheid reforms 

As a result of international outcry as well as the efforts from South African organizations such as the Black Sash, political prisoners and nonwhite prisoners gradually saw an equitable allocation of rights following the apartheid era in South Africa. The South African resistance movement gained traction and soon garnered a global following, and the end of apartheid culminated in a wave of transformative reform initiatives in 1994, which targeted the country's various structural inequalities. The unlawful imprisonment of Mandela brought increased scrutiny to the efficacy of the country's fundamental institutions of governance. Particular institutions administering justice and constitutional development, land affairs, education, health services, as well as housing and labor initiatives, were particularly restructured to establish equitable pathways for the Black South Africans who were re-entering a newly desegregated civil society. For South Africa's prison system, international diplomatic forces such as the United Nations and civil rights NGOs undertook particular reform efforts within the country.

Kampala Declaration 
The Kampala declaration was passed to safeguard human rights and invite third-party NGOs as enforcers of equal treatment (Sekhonyane, 2005). By establishing a legal charter of human rights recommendations to African prisoners, tangible reform was observed in South Africa as a result of the Kampala Declaration (Sekhonyane, 2005).

Ouagadougou Conference 
In 2002, the Ouagadougou Conference offered a follow-up analysis of prison reform progress that had been made following the Kampala Declaration (Sekhonyane, 2005). The conference followed with a declaration among African countries to reduce their prison populations and promote a universal African charter regarding prisoner's rights (Sekhonyane, 2005).

UN Standard Minimum Rules for the Treatment of Prisoners (Mandela Rules) 
In 2015, the United Nations adopted over the Mandela Rules, 120 rules that "represent, as a whole, the minimum conditions which are accepted as suitable" for the universal treatment of prisoners (United Nations, 2020).

Correctional Services Act 111 of 1998 
Section 134 of the Correctional Services Act lists the twenty-one regulations sanctioned by South African prisons to provide for its population:

White Papers on Corrections 
In November 2004, the White Papers were approved to replace the previous prison strategy which was implemented in 1994. It places a large emphasis on the rehabilitation of offenders in South African prisons. This document states the current challenges faced by the Department of Correctional Services regarding the correctional cycle, and lists new financial programs that will launched to help combat these challenges. These programs consist of Correction, Security, Facilities, Development, and After Care. Most importantly, the contents in the White Papers have the overarching theme of trying to achieve the goals set in place by the Department of Correctional Services: Human Dignity, Equality, Rights underlying humane treatment of every detainee, The right to health care services and other associated rights, Freedom and security of the person, Children’s rights, The right to education, Freedom of religion, Intergovernmental relations, and Values and principles governing Public Administration.

Modern domestic challenges to prison reform

Overcrowding 
A major issue in South African prisons involves the ballooning number of sentenced and un-sentenced prisoners in the country. Coinciding with the end of the apartheid era, prison populations in South Africa increased by "116,846 in January 1995 to 187,036 by the end of 2004," a 60% uptick (Giffard, 2006). Overcrowding in prison populations can be mitigated by the release of unsentenced prisoners awaiting trial, but this does not address the challenges to prison reform posed by overcrowding itself. With an increase in South African prison populations, prisoners are denied an equal, shared comprehensive access to the limited capacity of health services and government resources afforded to them. According to the World Prison Brief, the occupancy level of South Africa's prisons is at 137.4% of their official capacity (WPB, 2019). While numbers have stabilized over the past five years, it remains unclear "whether the rise in the prison population is due primarily to more criminals being sentenced or the increase in the average length of sentences being served" (IRR, 2012).

Racial discrimination 
As in the United States, South African prisons are not only overcrowded but also have highly disproportionate racial demographics. According to Africa Check, at the end of 2016, more than 125,000 Black Africans occupied South Africa's prisons in comparison to over 28,500 colored South Africans, 2,500 White South Africans, and 880 Asian/Indian groups (Africa Check, 2018). This means that more than 98% of South Africa's prisons are occupied by persons of color, in contrast to a white population of under 2%. With such high racial stratification within South African prison populations today, the continued precedence for facilities to remain overcrowded is likely. This is evident because coercive administration methods, skewed demographics, and insufficient mitigation efforts have long surrounded the South African prison system. This has contributed to an overall lack of oversight quality and delayed responsiveness for continued reform after the initial strides of the post-apartheid period.

Maltreatment of prisoners
Five persons who were inmates of Leeuwkop Prison in August 2014, claimed damages in 2022 for supposed injuries sustained in acts of brutal turture. They also claimed that they were unlawfully placed in solitary confinement without bedding and without treatment of their injuries. Their lawyers argued that there was a cover-up of the assaults. According to Lawyers for Human Rights, the case which resorts under the Prevention of Combating and Torture of Persons Act, is the first of its type in South Africa and will set a precedent for accountability of correctional services officials involved in the crime of torture.

References

Bibliography 
South Africa, 1998. Correctional Services Act 111 of 1998.

Chris Giffard, and Lukas Muntingh. “The Effect of Sentencing on the Size of the South African Prison Population.” Open Society Foundation for South Africa, October 2006, 87.

Gopolang Makou, Ina Skosana, and Ruth Hopkins. “FACTSHEET: The State of South Africa’s Prisons.” Africa Check, June 12, 2018. https://africacheck.org/factsheets/factsheet-the-state-of-south-africas-prisons/.

Jeremy Sarkin. “Prisons in Africa: An Evaluation from a Human Rights Perspective.” Sur International Human Rights Journal 9 (March 31, 2009): 22–49.

Kelly Gillespie. Containing the ‘Wandering Native’: Racial Jurisdiction and the Liberal Politics of Prison Reform in 1940s South Africa. Taylor and Francis 37, no. 3 (September 14, 2011): 499–515.

“List of South African Legislation.” Legislation Database. Kyalami, South Africa: ACTS Online, 2020. https://www.acts.co.za/site_search.

Makubetse Sekhonyane. March 16, 2005. Prison Reform in Africa: Recent Trends''

United Nations, 2020. Mandela Rules

“More Prisoners of Just Longer Sentences?” South African Institute of Race Relations, 2012. https://irr.org.za/media/media-releases/05Mar12.More_prisoners.pdf.

Natacha Philippi. Deviance, Punishment and Logics of Subjectification during Apartheid: Insane, Political and Common-Law Prisoners in a South African Gaol. Taylor and Francis 37, no. 3 (2011): 627–43.

“Regulation Gazette.” Section 134. July 30, 2004. Correctional Services Act 111 of 1998.

Dullah Omar Institute, 2019. South Africa:Prison Reform Legislation in South Africa. South Africa. Africa Criminal Justice Reform

World Prison Brief. “South Africa.” World Prison Brief Data, 2019. https://www.prisonstudies.org/country/south-africa.

South Africa